The Vermont Mountaineers are a collegiate summer baseball team based in Montpelier, Vermont. The team, a member of the New England Collegiate Baseball League, plays their home games at Montpelier Recreation Field.

History
In 2001, local citizens formed "Green Mountain Community Baseball", an organization formed in hopes of attracting an NECBL franchise to Montpelier, Vermont. In September of the following year the NECBL voted to expand to far-away Vermont, and to award a franchise to the group. The team's name, the Vermont Mountaineers, was chosen from more than 300 fan entries.

John Russo has been the team's manager since 2004 and has held some role with the team since its arrival in the league. General Manager Brian Gallagher spear-headed organizing the franchise and led the team since its inception.

The team's first game was on June 7, 2003, an 8-5 loss to the Manchester Silkworms. The game's attendance of 2,471 set a then-NECBL record for single game attendance. Although their inaugural season was not a success on the field (the Mountaineers had the second-worst record in the NECBL), it was in terms of attendance, with the club leading the league in average attendance per game. Nearly 35,000 fans watched the Mountaineers at Montpelier Recreation Field that season.

After reaching the playoffs in 2004, the team has enjoyed playoff success, qualifying for the playoffs in six of their first seven seasons. They have reached the NECBL Championship Series five times (2005, 2006, 2007, 2009), 2015) winning it three times (2006, 2007), 2015). Three of their five finals appearances have come against the Newport Gulls.

Postseason appearances

Records
Below is a list of all-time New England Collegiate Baseball League records set by the Mountaineers.

Team
Most triple plays in a season – 2, against the Keene Swamp Bats
Stolen bases in a game – 11 against the Manchester Silkworms on 7/31/08.
Stolen bases in a season – 118, 2011.
Runs in a game – 26, 2012 (Record shared with two (2) other teams).
Runs in a game, combined – 41, 2012
Sacrifice Hit - 38 2017

Individual
Sacrifice Bunts – 11 by Matt Smith, 2004 and Zach Babitt, 2010.
Most saves – 16 by Mark Murray, 2006.

Awards

End-of-season awards
2004 Top Relief Pitcher – McKenzie Willoughby (co-winner)
2005 Sportsmanship Award – Matt Rizzotti
2005 Manager of the Year – John Russo
2006 Defensive Player of the Year – Curt Smith
2006 Top Relief Pitcher – Mark Murray
2006 Sportsmanship Award – Robbie Minor
2006 Rookie of the Year – Chris Friedrich
2007 10th Player Award – A. J. Pollock
2008 Most Improved Player – Alejandro Balsinde
2014 Rookie of the Year – Blake Tiberi

All-NECBL Team
2005 – First Team: 1B Matt Rizzotti; Second Team: 3B Miguel Magrass.
2006 – First Team: P Joe Esposito, SS Robbie Minor, P Mark Murray, 3B Curt Smith, C Zach Zaneski; Second Team: P Chris Friedrich, 2B Troy Krider.
2007 – First Team: 1B Mike Sheridan, DH Curt Smith; Second team OF AJ Pollock.
2008 – Second Team P Casey Harman.
2009 – First Team OF Henry Dunn, C Jayson Hernandez; Second Team P Rob Kumbatovic.

Attendance
From their inception the Mountaineers have had some of the league's largest attendance figures.  In their inaugural season the Mountaineers enjoyed the highest average attendance in the league and have consistently been near the top of the league in this category since.

Attendance figures

2004 All-Star Game
The 2004 NECBL All-Star Game drew 4,127 fans to Montpelier Recreation Field, which set a then-NECBL record for All-Star Game attendance. Vermont's Northern Division squad was defeated by the Southern Division 7-4.  The record has since been broken at the 2009 NECBL All-Star Game hosted by the Holyoke Blue Sox. The 2009 game attracted 4,906 fans to Mackenzie Stadium in Holyoke, Massachusetts. However, the mark set in 2004 remains a Montpelier Recreation Field record.

Pro alumni
Below is a list of Mountaineers alumni who have gone on to play professional baseball. In total, over 103 former Mountaineers have signed professional contracts after playing for Vermont. 13 have reached the majors, with two players currently on active MLB rosters.

As of August 1, 2018.

Reached the Majors

National teams
Simon Rosenbaum, 2015, active with Team Israel.

Broadcasting 
The following former Mountaineer broadcasters have gone on to broadcast in professional baseball: Tim Hagerty-AAA (Mountaineers 2003), Kyle Berger-A (2004), Scott Montesano -Ind. (2005), Jonathan Barr-Ind. (2006), Paul Roper-Ind. (2007, currently broadcasting in the OHL), Carmine Vetrano -AHL/FHL/CanAm. (2010, currently broadcasting in American Hockey League, Federal Hockey League, and Can-Am League),

Media
Wcax.com, an area online news website run by WCAX-TV, produces reports and video highlights of Mountaineers games. The Barre Montpelier Times Argus, a local newspaper, also provides press coverage of games. The games are broadcast on [the NECBL Broadcast Network]].

References

External links
 Official website
 Digital tour of the Mountaineers' "Rec. Field".

New England Collegiate Baseball League teams
Montpelier, Vermont
Amateur baseball teams in Vermont
Fan-owned baseball teams
2003 establishments in Vermont
Baseball teams established in 2003